The Rage of Paris is a 1921 American silent drama film directed by Jack Conway and starring Miss DuPont, Elinor Hancock and Jack Perrin.

Cast
 Miss DuPont as Joan Coolidge 
 Elinor Hancock as Mrs. Coolidge 
 Jack Perrin as Gordon Talbut 
 Leo White as Jean Marot 
 Ramsey Wallace as Mortimer Handley 
 Freeman Wood as Jimmy Allen 
 Eve Southern as Mignonne Le Place 
 Mathilde Brundage as Mme. Courtigny 
 J.J. Lance as Mons. Dubet

References

Bibliography
 James Robert Parish & Michael R. Pitts. Film directors: a guide to their American films. Scarecrow Press, 1974.

External links
 

1921 films
1921 drama films
1920s English-language films
American silent feature films
Silent American drama films
Films directed by Jack Conway
American black-and-white films
Universal Pictures films
1920s American films